Maria do Carmo Abecassis is a Mozambican poet.

Abecassis was born in Lourenço Marques, Mozambique.
She is known for her collection of poems in Portuguese Em vez de asas tenho braços ("Instead of wings I have arms"), published in 1973. She was known to be employed by the Expresso newspaper of Lisbon in 1981.

Publications

References

Mozambican women writers
Mozambican poets
Mozambican women poets
Living people
Year of birth missing (living people)